The cluneal nerves (or clunial nerves) are cutaneous nerves of the buttocks. They are often classified according to where on the buttocks they innervate. Specifically, the nerves are as follows:

 Superior cluneal nerves
 Medial cluneal nerves
 Inferior cluneal nerves